Abbaslı (also, Abbasly) is a village and municipality in the Shamkir District of Azerbaijan. It has a population of 2,970.

References

External links
Satellite map at Maplandia.com 

Populated places in Shamkir District